The USA Pro Cycling Challenge, also known as USA Pro Challenge, was an annual multi-day professional road bicycle racing stage race that first took place in Colorado in 2011. Originally announced on August 4, 2010 by Colorado Governor Bill Ritter and Lance Armstrong as the Quiznos Pro Challenge, the event carried on the state's cycling legacy, which was most notably highlighted by the Coors Classic that ran from 1980 to 1988. On February 4, 2011 Richard E. Schaden, former owner of Quiznos and the event's co-chairman, announced the investment of an initial $10 million to secure the initial growth and longevity of the race. The USA Pro Cycling Challenge was one of only three current 2.HC rated races in the United States (along with the Tour of California, and the Tour of Utah), and was considered one of the most important pro cycling races in the U.S.
After the 2015 edition, Schaden was unable to find a title sponsor for the 2016 edition, and subsequently left as an investor.  The organizers were hoping to find a new investor to bring the race back for a 2017 edition, but the race folded after the 2015 edition.
Distance: 992 km

Winners

History

2011 edition

In 2011, the event took place between August 22–28, 2011 and featured 16 professional cycling teams  consisting of 135 riders; including the top three riders of the 2011 Tour de France: Cadel Evans, Andy Schleck and Fränk Schleck. Riders traveled 518 miles and climbed 36,250 total feet at altitudes of upwards of 12,000 feet during the seven days of competition.

The race received 25 hours of national television airtime on Versus and the NBC Sports Network and was seen by over one million people worldwide. On-air commentary was provided by Tour de France announcers Paul Sherwen, Phil Liggett and Bob Roll.

Americans swept the podium, with Levi Leipheimer winning the race, Christian Vande Velde finishing second, and Tejay van Garderen finishing third.

2012 edition

For 2012, the 683-mile race featured 42,000 feet of climbing, nine mountain passes (three of which exceed 12,000 feet), and three mountain top finishes. Four new cities joined the 2012 race including Durango, Telluride, Montrose and Boulder. The race was held from August 20–26 and featured an Individual Time Trial on the final day of racing in Denver. The race has received a 2.HC from the UCI (French: Hors categorie; English: beyond categorization), the highest rating for a continental tour stage race.

Similar to the first edition, Americans swept the podium, with Christian Vande Velde winning the race, Tejay van Garderen finishing second, and Levi Leipheimer finishing third.

2013 edition

The race took place from August 19–25, 2013.

American Tejay van Garderen of  won the overall title after finishing lower on the podium the previous two years. Mathias Frank of  finished second, becoming the first non-American to finish on the podium, while Tom Danielson of  finished third.

2014 edition

2015 edition

See also
Colorado Classic, Colorado cycling race held for both men and women in 2017 and 2018; becomes a women-only event from 2019 forward
Coors Classic, Colorado cycling race held from 1980-1988

References

External links

 
UCI America Tour races
Cycling in Colorado
Cycle races in the United States
Annual sporting events in the United States
2011 establishments in Colorado
Defunct cycling races in the United States